La Roquille is a commune in the Gironde department in Nouvelle-Aquitaine in southwestern France. It is located on the D708 route between Sainte-Foy-la-Grande and Margueron.

Population

See also
 Communes of the Gironde department

References

Communes of Gironde